Jiwanjot Singh (born 6 November 1990) is a cricketer who plays for Uttarakhand in Indian domestic cricket. He is a right-hand opening batsman.

Singh made his first-class debut during the 2012/13 Ranji Trophy against Hyderabad in November 2012 and scored 213. In the next game against Bengal, he made 158. He continued amassing runs in the subsequent matches and scored an unbeaten 110 on the fourth day against the defending champions Rajasthan to guide his team to a nine-wicket victory. He finished the season with 995 runs from 10 matches with five hundreds and two fifties  at an average of 66.33. Later in 2013, he was selected in India A and North Zone squads. He made his List A debut on 1 March 2014, for Punjab in the 2013–14 Vijay Hazare Trophy. He also played for Wickwar CC in the Pratt Cup taking 2 wickets against North Nibley in June 2022.

References

External links 
Jiwanjot Singh's profile page on Wisden

Indian cricketers
Punjab, India cricketers
North Zone cricketers
1990 births
Living people
Cricketers from Patiala